Albert Williams may refer to:
 
Albert Lynn Williams (1911–1982), American business executive; president of IBM in the 1960s
Albert Clifford Williams (1905–1987), Welsh Labour Party politician
Albert Rhys Williams (1883–1962), American journalist, labor organizer, and publicist 
Albert Williams (baseball) (born 1954), Major League Baseball player from Nicaragua
Albert Williams (trade unionist) (1927–2007), British trade union leader
Albert Williams (American football) (born 1964), American football linebacker
Albert Smiley Williams (1849–1924), American politician, mayor of Nashville, Tennessee
Albert Henry Wilmot Williams, British Army officer and courtier
Albert Williams, African-American man lynched by a mob in Chiefland, Florida, see Lynching of Albert Williams
Alby Williams (born 1916), Australian rules footballer

See also
Bertie Williams (1907–1968), Welsh footballer
Bert Williams (disambiguation)
Al Williams (disambiguation)